Taurai Muzarabani (born 27 March 1987) is a Zimbabwean cricketer. He made his Twenty20 International debut for Zimbabwe against India on 17 July 2015. He made his One Day International debut for Zimbabwe against Ireland on 13 October 2015. In July 2016 he was named in Zimbabwe's Test squad for their series against New Zealand, but he did not play.

References

External links
 

1987 births
Living people
Zimbabwean cricketers
Zimbabwe One Day International cricketers
Zimbabwe Twenty20 International cricketers